David John Pentecost (born 1940) is a British composer, a writer, a retired information technology specialist, and a retired British computer industry history researcher. He is a Certified Information Technology Professional, a Life Member of the British Computer Society, and also a Member of the Computer Conservation Society.

Early life and education

David Pentecost was born in London. He was educated privately in piano playing for seven years, from age 6. He attended Christ's College, Finchley (a grammar school in north London), until age 18, and then studied mathematics at Brunel College of Technology. Pentecost passed three examinations at the London College of Music, up to Intermediate level. He then taught himself a large repertoire of classical piano music, during subsequent years.

Significant information technology projects

Elliott Brothers (London) Ltd 

1960 – 1962 Pentecost worked as a computer programmer at computer manufacturer Elliott Brothers in Borehamwood, Hertfordshire – the first British company to become seriously involved with digital computer technology. Pentecost wrote software on the Elliott 405 computer to measure the precise execution time taken by another computer program running simultaneously on the same computer. This software was used to demonstrate that Elliott's employee Tony Hoare’s new sorting techniques method Quicksort was faster than previous sorting techniques. The Quicksort method, or a version of it, now forms the basis of most computer sorting programs.

Mills Associates Ltd 

In 1962, Pentecost moved to Mills Associates Ltd, where he headed a small team of programmers to implement a unit trust administration system, believed to be the first of its kind.

Unit Trust Services Ltd 

In 1967, Pentecost joined Unit Trust Services Ltd in the City of London, and in 1972 he was appointed as a director. He designed and implemented what was thought to be the first fully computerised unit trust contract note production system. He chose Honeywell’s new H316 industrial process control mini-computer, having persuaded Honeywell that it would be the first of its type to be used for commercial applications in the UK.

Coward Chance (later Clifford Chance) 

In 1980, Pentecost joined Coward Chance as Business Systems Manager. In 1985 Pentecost designed and implemented a system on a large Burroughs Corporation mainframe computer, to revolutionise the administrative aspects of the office, replacing typewriters with word processors, all linked to the central computer, for accounting, billing and other purposes. The system was called the Office Automation System, and it incorporated an internal electronic mail system, before electronic mail over the Internet became widely available to the general public.

Computer industry history research 

In 2003, Pentecost learned that Simon Lavington, Emeritus Professor of Computer Science at the University of Essex, was leading a project called Our Computer Heritage, to document the history of British computers for the Computer Conservation Society, whilst pioneers with the knowledge of these computers were still alive. The results of the project are now recorded on the website of the Computer Conservation Society. Pentecost offered, and was asked to lead part of the project, as co-ordinator for the Elliott 400 series of computers section of the website, and from 2003 to 2011 he collected information about the hardware, software and systems relating to these computers. One of his tasks was to find out about the Elliott 403 computer, which was also known as WREDAC. Only one had been built, in 1955, for the Government's Weapons Research Establishment, in Salisbury, South Australia, for the analysis of guided missile trials at Woomera. Simon Lavington referred to Pentecost's research on the 403 computer in two of his works.

Pentecost wrote an autobiography about his work in the computer industry, and included details of his research for the Computer Conservation Society's project to document early British computers. The Society regards his autobiography as a unique book, describing the complete working life experiences of a 20th-century computer programmer.The Archives of IT website also regards his autobiography worthy of inclusion in the Reminiscences section of its website

Music career 

In 1987 Pentecost took organ lessons from Catherine Ennis, at St Lawrence Jewry church, which led to his becoming, for a few years, one of the organists at St. Barnabas’ Church, in Linslade, Bedfordshire.

In 2001, he was accepted as a member of the Chopin Society in London. From 2002 to 2005, before emigrating to Cyprus, he played at five of the Society's Members’ Matinée concerts, and included in his programmes a few of his early piano compositions.

From 2007 to 2011, after emigrating to Cyprus, Pentecost formed and organised two groups of amateur pianists in Cyprus, one in Paphos, the other in Limassol. They were called Pianists’ Circles and were based on similar principles to those of the Chopin Society's Members’ Matinée concerts.

He began teaching himself to compose piano solo music in 1996, and he has continued this activity since then, as a professional composer. The Polish pianist  played Pentecost’s Reverie, Op.6 at a Polish Independence Day recital in Larnaca, Cyprus, on 5th November 2022.  Russian pianist Tatiana Stupak played one of his compositions at a concert at Cyprus’ Presidential Palace, and she played his Nocturne Op.18 at the Technopolis Cultural Centre in Paphos on 8 December 2017. She and another Russian pianist, Natalia Lezedova, played his early piano works in Cyprus at a public concert in Paphos. He helped Tatiana Stupak with the administration of her concerts in Cyprus after she turned professional.

The Cyprus national broadcaster, Cyprus Broadcasting Corporation classical music radio station RIK 4 Classic, has played some of Tatiana Stupak's recordings of his compositions.

In 2015, Pentecost researched the life of the once world-famous Scottish pianist Frederic Lamond (pianist), who was a pupil of Franz Liszt, shortly before Liszt's death in 1886. As a result, he made a documentary video, intended for students of music history, about Lamond and his time spent with Liszt.

In 2018, Pentecost won first prize for composition at the 4th International Competition of Musicians in Cyprus. 

To date (February 2023), he has written 65 piano solo works, and two works for violin and piano. A CD of seventeen of his compositions was issued in 2021, by stupakrecords.com, 16 played by Tatiana Stupak, and one played by himself. His music is generally not written in modern styles. His music is not atonal or minimalist. According to the sheet music published at sheetmusicplus.com, most of his works are in 19th century romantic styles, although a few works are baroque in style.
He has written a third autobiography, about his life in the world of music – see Notes k to n below.

List of works

Genealogy research projects 

From about 1981 to 1991, he researched the history of his father's family, tracing it back in England to about 1480, and publishing a book. He became a member of the Society of Genealogists in London. He also researched for a few years up to 2014, the history of his mother's family and associated families, producing several books totalling more than 800 pages, which were distributed electronically privately to family members.

Bibliography

References

External links
David Pentecost discography

Notes 

Alumni of Brunel University London
1940 births
Living people
British emigrants to Cyprus
British computer specialists
Members of the British Computer Society
English organists
British male organists
21st-century British composers
21st-century classical composers
21st-century British male musicians